The 2014 Big Easy Tour was the fourth season of the Big Easy Tour.

Schedule
The following table lists official events during the 2014 season.

Order of Merit
The Order of Merit was based on prize money won during the season, calculated in South African rand. The top five players on the tour earned status to play on the 2015 Sunshine Tour.

Notes

References

2014 in golf
2014 in South African sport